Vadim Alexandrovich Gurinov (Russian: Вадим Александрович Гуринов, born 21 December 1971) – an entrepreneur and investor, the founder of JSC  (tyre production) and Service-Telecom (an independent wireless telecommunication infrastructure operator).

Biography 
Vadim Gurinov was born on December 21, 1971.

Education 
In 1987, Gurinov graduated from high school with honors. In 1994, he graduated from the Saint Petersburg Institute of Fine Mechanics and Optics. In 1995, he also graduated from the Faculty of Economic Sciences at the Voznesensky Institute of Finance and Economics in Saint Petersburg (known as Saint Petersburg State University of Economics since 2012).

From 2005 to 2008, Gurinov attended several professional development trainings and received additional education, including the INSEAD Business School Executive Program (France) in 2008. In addition, he completed the Senior Executive Program at the London Business School and the Executive program at the Singularity University.

In 2010, Gurinov got a Ph.D. in sociology after defending his dissertation entitled The Implementation of Social Responsibility in the Management of Big Business in Modern Russia (the case of the «SIBUR-Russian Tyres»).

Career

Early years 
In 1991, Gurinov started his business in export-import operations and consumer goods trade. Together with his partners, he created the DealMakers company and a retail chain of denim stores selling clothes of the Turkish brand . In 1998, the business was sold.

In 1999, he became the company's deputy CEO. In 2003, he sold his share in business to Heinz.

In 1999–2000, Gurinov founded the  confectionary association and became its co-owner. Under his management, in 2002, the company became one of the leaders in confectionery production in Russia. Lyubimiy Kray had 450 employees. Gurinov sold his stake in the company in 2013. His strategic management increased Petrosoyuz's and Lyubimiy Kray's turnover to over $250 million in 2001.

Cordiant 
From 2003 to 2011, Gurinov was the CEO of Sibur's subsidiary, Sibur-Russian Tyres. Prior to his appointment, Sibur's tyre business was unprofitable, and its organization was fragmented. Vadim Gurinov united these disparate business units under one holding company, bringing it to profit in 2006.

At the end of 2011, Gurinov reached an agreement with Sibur that Sibur-Russian Tyres's top managers and third-party investors would buy out the company. In December 2011, the deal was finalized, and Gurinov became the owner of the controlling stake of 80%. After that, Sibur-Russian Tyres was renamed into Cordiant, and Gurinov was appointed the company's Chairman of the board of directors. In addition, he proposed a development strategy that allowed the company to expand significantly. As a result, in 2021, Cordiant became the second largest player in the market.

In 2017, Gurinov transferred his shares in Cordiant to his wife, Galina Gurinova. Consequently, she became the company's controlling shareholder, and the company was considered a family asset.

Service-Telecom 
In 2015, Service-Telecom was founded, and Vadim Gurinov became its chairman of the board of directors. He formed the company's development strategy, resulting in Service-Telecom's expansion: while the company owned 350 telecommunication infrastructure facilities in 2015–2016, their number increased by 18500 by 2022. Thus, Service-Telecom took 21% of the tower infrastructure market in Russia.

Other activities 
In 2007, Gurinov became a member of SIBUR Holding's management board.

From November 2011 to August 2012, he was the CEO of Russian Sea - Dobycha (now the company is renamed Russian Fishery). As of 2013, he owned 12,6% of the company's shares.

Since 2009, Vadim Gurinov has been a shareholder of AvestraGroup, an independent supplier of petrochemical products from Russia to foreign markets with representative offices in the UAE, Switzerland, and Finland.

In 2015, Gurinov invested in creating interregional centers for sterilizing technologies that would provide next-generation sterilization services in various industries, including medicine, agriculture, and automotive component manufacturing.

In 2017, he became a member of the Board of Directors of the Arkhangelsk Experimental Seaweed Plant. In 2021, Technical Hemp Processing Technologies (owned by Galina and Vadim Gurinov) acquired almost 27,5% of Nizhny Novgorod Hemp Fibers LLC. Furthermore, Gurinov invests in fintech projects (neo-banking, online registers) that are implemented at the first stage in South-East Asia (Vietnam, Indonesia, Sri Lanka, Malaysia). He is also an investor in a marketplace project in African countries.

His investment portfolio also includes investments in premium real estate in central London and highly liquid suburban locations in the United Kingdom.

Family 
Gurinov is married to Galina Nikolayevna Gurinova. They have three children.

References 

1971 births
Russian businesspeople
Russian business executives
Saint Petersburg University of Economics and Finance alumni
Living people